Soharin (also Romanized as Soharīn and Sohrīn; also known as Mehrīn, Zokhrun, Z̄ūkarā’īn, and Zukrāīn) is a village in, and the capital of, Soharin Rural District of Qareh Poshtelu District of Zanjan County, Zanjan province, Iran. At the 2006 National Census, its population was 2,309 in 602 households, when it was in Qareh Poshtelu-e Bala Rural District. The following census in 2011 counted 2,390 people in 715 households. The latest census in 2016 showed a population of 2,424 people in 771 households, by which time it was in the newly established Soharin Rural District and was its largest village.

References 

Zanjan County

Populated places in Zanjan Province

Populated places in Zanjan County